Gerede District is a district of the Bolu Province of Turkey. Its seat is the town of Gerede. Its area is 1,060 km2, and its population is 33,833 (2021). Gerede is a large area of hill country surrounded by pine-covered mountains, on a passage from central Anatolia to the Black Sea coast. The climate is notoriously cold and wet, enough to make it a centre for cross-country skiing, and traffic on the highway often has to negotiate fog, rain and ice around Gerede.

Composition
There is one municipality in Gerede District:
 Gerede

There are 92 villages in Gerede District:

 Afşartarakçı
 Ağızörengüney
 Ahmetler
 Akbaş
 Akçabey
 Akçaşehir
 Aktaş
 Aktaşkurtlar
 Aşağıörenbaşı
 Aşağıovacık
 Asmaca
 Aydınlar
 Bahçedere
 Balcılar
 Beşkonak
 Birinciafşar
 Bünüş
 Çağış
 Çalaman
 Çalışlar
 Çayören
 Çayörengüney
 Çoğullu
 Çukurca
 Dağkara
 Danişmentler
 Davutbeyli
 Demircisopran
 Demirler
 Dikmen
 Dursunfakı
 Elören
 Enseliler
 Ertuğrulköy
 Eymür
 Geçitler
 Göynükören
 Güneydemirciler
 Hacılar
 Halaçlar
 Hasanlar
 Havullu
 Ibrıcak
 İkinciafşar
 İmamlar
 İnköy
 Kalaç
 Kapaklı
 Karacadağ
 Karacadağdemirciler
 Karapazar
 Kavacık
 Kayıkiraz
 Kayısopran
 Kazanlar
 Koçumlar
 Kösreli
 Külef
 Kürkçüler
 Macarlar
 Mangallar
 Mircekiraz
 Mukamlar
 Muratfakılar
 Mürdükler
 Nuhören
 Örencik
 Ortaca
 Salur
 Samat
 Sapanlıurgancılar
 Sarıoğlu
 Sipahiler
 Sofular
 Süllertoklar
 Sungurlar
 Tatlar
 Ulaşlar
 Ümitköy
 Yağdaş
 Yakaboy
 Yakakaya
 Yazıkara
 Yazıköy
 Yelkenler
 Yenecik
 Yeniyapar
 Yeşilvadi
 Yukarıörenbaşı
 Yukarıovacık
 Yunuslar
 Zeyneller

References

Districts of Bolu Province